Bob Mitchell Sheldon (born November 27, 1950) is an American former Major League Baseball second baseman who played parts of three seasons,  and , for the Milwaukee Brewers.

Sheldon was born in Montebello, California, and graduated from Montebello High School. The Brewers drafted him out of Loyola Marymount University in the 22nd round of the 1972 amateur draft. He broke into the majors in April 1974, his third pro season.

His most sustained tenure in MLB came in 1975, when Sheldon started in 45 games for the Brewers at either second base or designated hitter, and had a batting average of .287. Overall, he collected 67 hits in his 94 games in the majors, including eight doubles and five triples, along with 17 runs batted in.

His pro career concluded after the 1977 season.

References

External links

1950 births
Living people
Baseball players from California
Loyola Marymount Lions baseball players
Major League Baseball second basemen
Milwaukee Brewers players
Newark Co-Pilots players
Shreveport Captains players
Spokane Indians players
Sportspeople from Montebello, California
Sacramento Solons players